Querco District is one of sixteen districts of the Huaytará Province in Peru.

Geography 
Other mountains are listed below:

References